Demarcus Malik Evans (born October 22, 1996) is an American professional baseball pitcher in the New York Yankees organization. He made his Major League Baseball (MLB) debut in 2020 for the Texas Rangers.

Amateur career
Evans attended Petal High School in Petal, Mississippi. Evans was drafted by the Texas Rangers in the 25th round of the 2015 MLB draft and signed with them for a $100,000 signing bonus, forgoing his college commitment to Hinds Community College.

Professional career

Texas Rangers
After signing, Evans was assigned to the Arizona League Rangers of the Rookie-level Arizona League to make his professional debut; in  innings pitched for them, he posted a 0–0 record with a 2.31 ERA. He split the 2016 season between the AZL Rangers and the Spokane Indians of the Class A Short Season Northwest League. In a combined 14 games (12 starts), he went 1–2 with a 2.95 ERA, striking out 75 in 55 innings. He split 2017 between the AZL Rangers, Spokane, and Hickory Crawdads of the Class A South Atlantic League, going a combined 2–8 with a 4.53 ERA in 20 games (14 starts). He spent 2018 with Hickory, going 4–1 with a 1.77 ERA, while striking out 103 in 56.0 innings. He earned a spot on the South Atlantic League post-season all-star team. After the 2018 regular season, Evans played for the Surprise Saguaros of the Arizona Fall League. Evans was named the Texas Rangers 2018 Minor League Reliever of the Year.

Evans was assigned to the Down East Wood Ducks of the Class A-Advanced Carolina League to open the 2019 season. He went 4–0 with a 0.81 ERA and 40 strikeouts in  innings for them. On May 29, he was promoted to the Frisco RoughRiders of the Double-A Texas League. With Frisco, Evans went 2–0 with a 0.96 ERA and 60 strikeouts over  innings. Evans was named the 2019 MiLB Relief Pitcher of the Year by Baseball America. Evans was named the Texas Rangers 2019 Minor League Reliever of the Year. Following the 2019 season, Evans played for Leones del Escogido of the Dominican Winter League. Evans was added to the Rangers 40–man roster following the 2019 season.

On September 15, 2020, Evans was promoted to the major leagues for the first time. He made his debut on September 18 against the Los Angeles Angels, surrendering Albert Pujols' career home run number 662. In four appearances for Texas in 2020, Evans recorded a 2.25 ERA with 4 strikeouts over 4 innings. Evans split the 2021 season between Texas and the Round Rock Express of the Triple-A West. With Texas he went 0–2 with a 5.13 ERA and 33 strikeouts over  innings, and with Round Rock he posted a 2–0 record with a 3.74 ERA and 31 strikeouts over  innings. He was designated for assignment on June 26, 2022. He sent the 2022 season back with Round Rock, going 2–3 with a 3.82 ERA over 33 innings. He elected free agency on November 10, 2022.

New York Yankees
On December 8, 2022, Evans signed a minor league contract with the New York Yankees.

Personal life
Evans and professional baseball outfielder Anthony Alford are cousins.

References

External links

1996 births
Living people
People from Petal, Mississippi
Baseball players from Mississippi
African-American baseball players
Major League Baseball pitchers
Texas Rangers players
Arizona League Rangers players
Spokane Indians players
Hickory Crawdads players
Down East Wood Ducks players
Frisco RoughRiders players
Round Rock Express players
Surprise Saguaros players
Leones del Escogido players
American expatriate baseball players in the Dominican Republic
21st-century African-American sportspeople